Who Has Seen the Wind is a 1977 Canadian drama film directed by Allan King and written by Patricia Watson. The film is an adaptation of W. O. Mitchell's influential novel Who Has Seen the Wind. It was the first narrative feature film ever directed by King, who was previously known primarily as a documentary filmmaker.

The film stars Brian Painchaud as Brian O'Connall, with a supporting cast including Douglas Junor, Patricia Hamilton, Gordon Pinsent, Helen Shaver, Chapelle Jaffe, Charmion King, Leslie Carlson, Hugh Webster and José Ferrer.

Although Painchaud received positive critical attention for his performance, it was the only film he ever made before his death in 1986.

Synopsis
The story revolves around Brian (Brian Painchaud), a young boy who lives a magical life on the Canadian prairies catching prairie dogs and playing with friends. The magic ends when his father (Gordon Pinsent) falls ill, and he witnesses the harsh realities of adult life. This coming-of-age story provides a poignant look at life on the prairies during the Great Depression.

Production
W. O. Mitchell was paid $11,000 for the film rights to Who Has Seen the Wind. The film was shot from 30 August to 15 October 1976, on a budget of $1,120,000 and $300,000 of the film's budget came from the Saskatchewan government.

Release
The film was released in Arcola, Saskatchewan, on 20 October 1977, and was distributed by Astral Films in Canada and Janus Films in the United States.

Reception
The film was awarded the Academy of Canadian Cinema and Television's Golden Reel Award in 1978 as the top-grossing Canadian film of the previous year, with a gross of $1.2 million. It was nominated for a Gold Hugo (Best Feature) at the 1978 Chicago International Film Festival.

References

Works cited

External links

1977 films
Canadian drama films
English-language Canadian films
Films based on Canadian novels
Films directed by Allan King
Films set in Saskatchewan
Films shot in Saskatchewan
Films scored by Eldon Rathburn
W. O. Mitchell
1970s English-language films
1970s Canadian films